Carex ozarkana, the Ozark sedge, is a species of flowering plant in the family Cyperaceae, native to the U.S. states of Oklahoma, Texas, Arkansas, and Louisiana. A perennial forming loose tufts and reaching , it is found growing in permanently wet soils.

References

ozarkana
Endemic flora of the United States
Flora of Oklahoma
Flora of Texas
Flora of Arkansas
Flora of Louisiana
Plants described in 1996